Jovan Šajnović (1924–2004) was a renowned Yugoslavian conductor and university professor.

Education

Šajnović started to study music with eminent Yugoslav musicians - Emil Hajek (piano), Ljubica Marić (composing) and Mihajlo Vukdragović (conducting). In 1946, he went to Zagreb, in order to continue his musical training with famous conductor from Berlin - Fritz Zaun.

He graduated from the Zagreb Academy of Music, Croatia, SFRY, where he studied conducting, composition, and piano. While there, he studied with professors Fritz Zaun, S. Šulek and I. Maček.

Conducting career

Šajnović started his career in Zagreb Opera, as an accompanist. Later, he continued his engagement as  an opera conductor and was finally appointed the director of Opera (1974–1979).  After 37 years spent in Zagreb Opera, he went back to Belgrade, where was conductor and director of the Belgrade Philharmonic Orchestra (1984–1989) and Belgrade Opera (1993–1997).

Additionally, he performed and recorded as a guest conductor with many orchestras in Yugoslavia and abroad (Vienna, Dublin, Mexico City, etc.)
He was esteemed especially as the interpreter of the operas of Mozart, Beethoven, Verdi, Bizet, Wagner, R. Strauss, Smetana and Devčić. He also frequently performed compositions by Bruckner, Mahler, Max Reger and Shostakovitch.

Teaching career
Šajnović was Professor of Opera Studio at the University of Zagreb Academy of Music,  Professor of Conducting and  Chief of the Department of Conducting at the Faculty of Music in Belgrade, and Professor of Conducting, Orchestration and Aesthetics at the University of Priština Faculty of Arts. On Vidovdan 2004, he was rewarded the Distinguished Professor Award by the Chancellor of the University of Priština.

References 
 Danas, November 24, 2004
 Glas javnosti, June 3, 2004
 Jedinstvo, July 5, 2004, p. 4
 Muzička enciklopedija, III (1977), Jugoslovenski leksikografski zavod, Zagreb
 Pedeset godina Fakulteta muzičke umetnosti (Muzičke akademije) 1937-1987 (1988), Univerzitet umetnosti u Beogradu, Beograd

1924 births
2004 deaths
Musicians from Belgrade
Yugoslav conductors (music)
Academic staff of the University of Pristina
Academic staff of the University of Arts in Belgrade
20th-century conductors (music)